Double Play is a 2017 drama film directed by Ernest Dickerson. It is based on Curaçaoan author Frank Martinus Arion's internationally acclaimed Dutch-language novel Dubbelspel. The title Double Play refers to a move in dominoes where a player can play a final domino on either end of the snake, earning that team double points.

Plot
Ostrik, now a grown man working as a doctor in the Netherlands, returns to his childhood home on the island of Curaçao and recalls his experiences with his family and neighbors there during a time of colonial unrest in the 1970s. Each Sunday his father Bubu would play dominoes with his friends while discussing a variety of issues as Ostrik would observe. After chasing bus drivers away from an important location for taxi cabs, Bubu becomes the likely choice for president of a newly formed taxi cab union. That Sunday the union meeting for the election is scheduled to be held at his house but the drivers witness Bubu experiencing a day-long losing streak at dominoes and they begin to lose confidence in him until he gives a rousing speech about revolution. Before he has the opportunity to become president, he gets into a fight with the man his wife is sleeping with and loses his life. Ostrik returns years later to confront his father's killer over a game of dominoes.

Cast
Lennie James as Chamon
Melanie Liburd as Solema
La La Anthony as Micha
Bronson Pinchot as Bob
Louis Gossett Jr. as Coco
Colin Salmon as Old Ostrik
Mustafa Shakir as Manchi
Isaach De Bankolé as Ernesto
Barbara Eve Harris as Old Vera
Alexander Karim as Bubu
Saycon Sengbloh as Nora
Dani Dare as Ostrik
Heather Jocelyn Blair as Bob's Prim Wife

Production
The film is adapted from Curaçaoan author Frank Martinus Arion's Dutch-language novel Dubbelspel. Filming took place on Curaçao.

References

External links

2017 films
2017 drama films
American drama films
2010s English-language films
Films about games
Films about infidelity
Films about prostitution in the Netherlands
Films about taxis
Films based on Dutch novels
Films directed by Ernest Dickerson
Films set in the 1970s
Films set in Curaçao
Films shot in Curaçao
Murder in films
2010s American films